The Middle States Championships also known as the Middle States Sectional Championships or Championship of the Middle States was regional level tournament held at various locations from  1885 to 1968.

History
The spring Championship of the Middle States were first staged at the St George's Cricket Club, Hoboken, New Jersey on 9 June 1885. The first winner of the men's singles event was Richard D. Sears. The tournament was classified as a regional championship by the United States Lawn Tennis Association until 1900 when they started to be referred to as sectional championships (a geographic, competitive term, but nothing to do with how they are governed.

Championship finals

Men's Singles

Women's Singles
Incomplete Roll

References

Sources
 Hall, Valentine Gill (1889). "Tournaments of 1885: Summary". Lawn tennis in America. Biographical sketches of all the prominent players ... knotty points, and all the latest rules and directions governing handicaps, umpires, and rules for playing. New York: New York, D. W. Granbery &  co.
 Heathcote, John Moyer (1891). Tennis. London: Longmans, [Green,].
 Kimball, Warren F. (2017). "2: The Founding Gentlemen 1877-1913". The United States Tennis Association: Raising the Game. Lincoln, Nebraska: U of Nebraska Press.
 Nieuwland, Alex. "Tournament – Middle States Championships". www.tennisarchives.com. A. Nieuwland.
 Paret, Jahial Parmly; Allen, J. P.; Alexander, Frederick B.; Hardy, Samuel [from old catalog (1918). Spalding's tennis annual . New York: New York, American sports publishing company

Defunct tennis tournaments in the United States